Calandrinia elegans is a species of plants in the family Montiaceae.

References

External links
 Calandrinia at the International Plant Names Index (IPNI)

Plants described in 1836
elegans